Bobbys Run is a stream in Burlington County, New Jersey, in the United States.

Bobbys Run was previously known as Dimsdale Run; both names honor Dr. Robert Dimsdale, a 17th-century landowner.

See also
List of rivers of New Jersey

References

Rivers of Burlington County, New Jersey
Rivers of New Jersey